Sviatoslav Andriiovych Yurash (born 16 February 1996) is a Ukrainian politician who represents the Servant of the People party in the Verkhovna Rada (Ukraine's parliament), to which he was elected in 2019. , Yurash is the youngest Ukrainian MP. He was previously the Euromaidan press centre organiser and senior spokesperson for Volodymyr Zelenskyy's successful 2019 presidential election campaign. Yurash co-founded the cross-party conservative grouping Values. Dignity. Family. in the Ukrainian parliament.

Biography 
Sviatoslav Yurash was born in Lviv, Ukraine, on 16 February 1996. He studied international relations in Poland and was studying in Kolkata when the Euromaidan protests broke out.

During the 2022 Russian invasion of Ukraine, along with other People's Deputies, he has been photographed patrolling the streets of Kyiv armed with a Kalashnikov. In March 2022, Yurash's girlfriend, Oleksandra Kuvshynova, was killed when the car that she was in was hit by Russian shelling.

References

1996 births
Living people
Ninth convocation members of the Verkhovna Rada
Servant of the People (political party) politicians